Source of Labor was a rap band formed in 1989 in Seattle, Washington, consisting of Wordsayer, Negus I, DJ Kamikaze, and later, Vitamin D.

History 
Wordsayer and Negus I are brothers and Kamikaze was their roommate when they began performing at Langston Hughes Performing Arts Center in Seattle's  Central District in 1989. Source of Labor began a collective at that time that evolved into a record label called Jasiri Media Group. Their first show in downtown Seattle was in 1993 at the Crocodile Cafe.

Source of Labor was loosely associated with the female rap act Beyond Reality, whose lead, MC Kylea, was Wordsayer's partner and mother of his first child. Both of which performed at the all-day Rap Festival (featuring 30 or more of the top regional rap/hip-hop acts of that time). The event, much like Lollapolooza, was strictly Rap and was called "Phunky Phat 95." It took place at the Evergreen State College during the summer of 1995. Source of Labor performed at Seattle's arts festival, Bumbershoot, and inspired Macklemore to become a rapper. Wordsayer later gave Macklemore his first show at age 15. Source of Labor has been an inspiration to many other artists like Nardwuar the Human Serviette, Ryan Lewis, Strath Shepard, and Thee Satisfaction.

Source of Labor's contributions to Northwest hip hop were extremely influential in shaping post-Nastmix hip-hop. They were part of Seattle's second hip hop movement, the first wave centering around Nastymix recording artist Sir-Mix-a-Lot. Some credit the group's front man, Wordsayer, with personally moving hip-hop out of Seattle's Central District and into the rest of the city. In 1997 Source of Labor's DJ Kamikaze was replaced by Vitamin D.

Source of Labor disbanded in 2004 and the artists went on to focus on their individual projects. Wordsayer continued producing and taught poetry at Franklin High School. Vitamin D continued his rapping and production career.

Wordsayer, born Jonathan Moore, died of kidney failure in March 2017.

Discography

Albums, EPs, and Singles

Guest Appearances, Compilations, and B-Sides

External links

MTV

References 

American hip hop groups
Musical groups from Washington (state)
Rappers from Seattle
Rappers from Washington (state)